Taipei City Hall is a metro station in Taipei, Taiwan served by Taipei Metro.

Station overview

The two-level, underground station structure with an island platform and four exits. The size of the station is larger than most other stations on the Nangang Line. The station is situated under Zhongxiao East Road, between Keelung Road and Songren Road. Washrooms are located outside of the fare area of the station. Due to crowding during New Year's festivities, automatic platform gates have been installed at this station.

In recent years, the station has gone through renovations to connect it with a bus transfer station, mall, and hotel above. The Taipei City Hall Bus Station opened for service on 5 August 2010.

In February 2009, a -long vegetal wall was unveiled at the station for a two-month exhibition. It was expected to absorb  of carbon dioxide while releasing  of oxygen.

Public art
Numerous pieces of public art are situated in and around the station. A series of five sculptures (titled "Growth") are placed around the station. "Furrows" and "Push" (granite/marble) are located in entrance square, while "Sprout", "Twist", and "Sway" (bronze/aluminum statues) are located on the station platform.

Station layout

Exits
Exit 1: Song Shan Senior High School／United Daily News Office
Exit 2: Taipei City Hall Bus Station／Uni-Ustyle Department Stores, Eslite Bookstore, Taipei City Hall 
Exit 3: Xinyi Shopping District／Breeze XIN YI
Exit 4: TCWC Children Home

Operations
Because the station is underneath Zhongxiao East Road and nearby the newly developed Xinyi District, the Taipei City Hall station is one of the most widely used station in the Taipei Metro. In 2008, the station handled 86,967 passengers (entries/exits) per day. Since the opening of the Taipei City Hall Bus Station, daily ridership increased during November 2010 to 116,400, becoming the second-busiest station, only behind Taipei Main Station. Due to the large crowd during weekends and rush hours, the parallel Xinyi Line has been constructed to disperse some of the crowds. To cope with crowds during New Year's Eve celebrations, designated trains pass through the station without stopping.

The station is also a transit station for local and long-distance buses to Neihu, Sanchong, Xinzhuang, Luzhou, Jingmei, Muzha, and to Keelung, Taoyuan, Zhongli, Miaoli, Taichung, etc. A large bus transit terminal was constructed between the space of exit 1 and the United Daily News Office. The station also provides free shuttle bus transport to the Taipei 101 Financial Center and to the World Trade Center during major exhibitions.

Around the station

Transport
Taipei City Hall Bus Station

Government and financial organizations
 Taipei City Hall
 Discovery Center of Taipei
 Taipei City Council
 Hong Kong Economic, Trade and Cultural Office
 Netherlands Trade and Investment Office
Uni-President International Building
 British Office Taipei
 Canadian Trade Office in Taipei
 Criminal Investigation Bureau
 Taipei Songshan High School
 Financial Data Center, Ministry of Finance
 CPC Corporation
 United Cooperation International Headquarters
 United Daily News Office

Entertainment
 Songshan Cultural and Creative Park
Taiwan Design Center
Taipei New Horizon
Eslite Spectrum
Uni-Ustyle Department Stores
Breeze XIN YI
BELLAVITA Shopping Center
 Eslite Xinyi Branch
 Shinkong Mitsukoshi
VIESHOW Cinemas
 ATT 4 Fun
Taipei World Trade Center
Taipei International Convention Center
Taipei World Trade Center International Trade Building
 Taipei 101

References

Bannan line stations
Railway stations opened in 1999
1999 establishments in Taiwan
Xinyi Special District